Ashat Kerimbay (b. November 1947) is a Chinese politician of Kazakh ethnicity.

Biography
Ashat was born in 1947 in Yining, Xinjiang Uygur Autonomous Region. He graduated from Xinjiang University and joined the CCP in 1975.

References
China Vitae: Biography of Ashat Kerimbay

Living people
1947 births
People's Republic of China politicians from Xinjiang
People from Yining County
Political office-holders in Xinjiang
Ili Kazakh Autonomous Prefecture governors
Delegates to the 8th National People's Congress
Delegates to the 7th National People's Congress
Members of the Standing Committee of the 12th National People's Congress
Members of the 11th Chinese People's Political Consultative Conference